Kwese is a Bantu language of the Democratic Republic of Congo.

See also

References

Pende languages
Languages of the Democratic Republic of the Congo